Susica sinensis, the statuesque cup moth, is a moth of the family Limacodidae. It is found in China, Taiwan, Laos, Thailand and Vietnam.

References

 , 1931: Descriptions of some new Genera and Species from Japan, with a List of Species of the family Cochlidionidae. Matsumurana, 5 (3): 101-116. Full article: 
 , 2009: The Limacodidae of Vietnam. Entomofauna Supplement 16: 33-229.

Moths described in 1856
Limacodidae
Moths of Asia
Taxa named by Francis Walker (entomologist)